Robert Bernard Meyer (born August 4, 1939) is an American former Major League Baseball left-handed pitcher. He was signed by the New York Yankees as an amateur free agent in 1960. Meyer pitched for the Yankees (1964), Los Angeles Angels (1964), Kansas City Athletics (1964), Seattle Pilots/Milwaukee Brewers (1969–1970). His first major league strikeout victim was future Hall of Famer Carl Yastrzemski. During a three-year baseball career, Meyer compiled two wins, 92 strikeouts, and a 4.38 earned run average.

On September 12, 1964, while starting for the Athletics on the road at Memorial Stadium, he and Baltimore Orioles left-hander Frank Bertaina each pitched a complete game one-hitter, but the A's lost 1–0 as Jackie Brandt hit a sacrifice fly in the bottom of the eighth to score pinch-runner Bob Saverine from third.

Other career highlights include a six scoreless inning win against the Kansas City Athletics on June 26, 1964, a six-hit, complete game win (6–1) against the Baltimore Orioles on September 7, 1964, and pitching the first nine innings and giving up one unearned run in a 13-inning victory over the New York Yankees on September 1, 1969.

References

External links
, or Baseball Library, or Retrosheet, or Pura Pelota (Venezuelan Winter League)

1939 births
Living people
Amarillo Gold Sox players
Augusta Yankees players
Baseball players from Ohio
Binghamton Triplets players
Birmingham Barons players
Florida Instructional League Athletics players
Iowa Oaks players
Kansas City Athletics players
Los Angeles Angels players
Major League Baseball pitchers
Milwaukee Brewers players
Modesto Reds players
Navegantes del Magallanes players
American expatriate baseball players in Venezuela
New York Yankees players
Richmond Virginians (minor league) players
Seattle Pilots players
Sportspeople from Toledo, Ohio
Toledo Rockets baseball players
University of Toledo alumni
Vancouver Mounties players